Harper Green School is a coeducational secondary school located in Farnworth, Greater Manchester, England. On 1 March 2017 the school converted into an Academy along with Rivington and Blackrod High School. The school is part of Leverhulme Academy Trust.

Built around a central quad, it became comprehensive in 1982. The school is housed in a mixture of traditional and modern buildings where there are facilities for a wide range of activities and interests. The accommodation facilities include 23 general classrooms, two music rooms, recording studio, theatre, eight ICT rooms, two dance studios, 11 science laboratories and three art and design workshops including specialist facilities for ceramics, printmaking and ICT. The sports facilities include indoor and outdoor tennis courts, large sports hall and gymnasium and extensive playing fields including Astroturf, soccer and hockey pitch. It also runs groups after-school studying dance and examination coursework.

The school houses the Alan Ball Sports Hall, as well as the Peter Kay Theatre. In 2006, Peter Kay filmed a music video at Harper Green with the Scottish band Texas.

References

Secondary schools in the Metropolitan Borough of Bolton
Academies in the Metropolitan Borough of Bolton
Farnworth